Gonzalo García (born 5 March 1999) is an Argentine rugby union player, currently playing for United Rugby Championship side Zebre Parma. His preferred position is scrum-half.

Professional career
García represented both Ceibos and Cafeteros Pro in the Súper Liga Americana de Rugby competition in 2020 and 2021 respectively. 
In 2021−2022 season, he played for ItalianTop10 side Valorugby Emilia.

International career
After the experience with Argentina U20 squad, he was named in the Argentina squad for the 2021 Rugby Championship. He made his debut in Round 3 of the 2021 Rugby Championship against New Zealand.

References

External links
itsrugby.co.uk Profile

1999 births
Living people
Argentine rugby union players
Argentina international rugby union players
Rugby union scrum-halves
Dogos XV players
Cafeteros Pro players
Valorugby Emilia players
Zebre Parma players
Sportspeople from Santa Fe, Argentina